Where It All Began is the debut studio album by American country music duo Dan + Shay. It was released on April 1, 2014 via Warner Bros. Nashville. The album includes the singles "19 You + Me", "Show You Off", and "Nothin' Like You".

Critical reception

Where It All Began has garnered generally positive reviews from five music critics. Brian Mansfield of USA Today gave the album three stars out of four, saying stating that the duo "make[s] the music of first dates and summertime flings that last forever in the memory", and their "sun-kissed harmonizing and carefree delivery may be informed by contemporary pop, but they're storytellers at heart." Alanna Conaway of Country Weekly gave the album a B grade, writing that the duo "have emerged [...] as true songwriters and vocalists, and still have plenty of directions to go with future albums." However, Conaway believes that the album could have been better in the lyrical department because they focus on "the good memories and moments in life." Mark Deming of AllMusic rated it three out of five stars, saying that "As far as craft goes, Dan + Shay clearly know what they're doing and are remarkably canny" and "If country radio needs clean-cut but hunky young men to croon with maximum professionalism for female listeners (and the guys who want to get to know them better), there's no question Dan + Shay can fill the bill, and Where It All Began shows they do what they do very well indeed." Matt Bjorke of Roughstock rated the album four out of five stars, stating that the release "feels like the album will indeed be the point where the duo and fans point to and say" this is the place it started, which according to him is "Not bad for the music world’s latest 'overnight sensation.'" Tara Toro of Got Country Online rated the album three-and-a-half stars out of five, writing that "The songs flow together nicely, but at times tend to sound alike, especially lyrically." In addition, Toro closes with saying that this "is an easy to listen to youthful album that many country fans surely wont 'say no' to adding to their library."

Commercial performance
Where It All Began debuted at number six on the US Billboard 200 and number one on the US Top Country Albums, selling 29,000 album-equivalent units in its first week. As of June 2016, the album has sold 157,000 copies in the United States. On January 10, 2018, the album was certified gold by the Recording Industry Association of America (RIAA) for combined sales and album-equivalent units of over 500,000 in the United States.

Track listing

All songs produced by Dan Smyers, Scott Hendricks, and Danny Orton, except "Can't Say No", produced by Smyers and Hendricks, and "Nothin' Like You", produced by Chris DeStefano.

Personnel
Dan + Shay
 Shay Mooney – acoustic guitar, lead vocals, background vocals
 Dan Smyers – banjo, acoustic guitar, electric guitar, percussion, programming, background vocals

Additional musicians
 Tim Akers – programming
 Eric Darken – percussion
 Chris DeStefano – bass guitar, drums, acoustic guitar, electric guitar, keyboards, mandolin, and programming on "Nothin' Like You"
 Carolyn Dawn Johnson – background vocals on "Party Girl"
 Anthony LaMarchina – cello
 Craig Nelson – acro bass
 Danny Orton – drums, keyboards, programming
 Carol Rabinowitz – cello
 Adam Shoenfeld – electric guitar
 Jimmie Lee Sloas – bass guitar
 Bryan Sutton – banjo, acoustic guitar, mandolin

Charts

Weekly charts

Year-end charts

Singles

Certifications

References

2014 debut albums
Dan + Shay albums
Warner Records albums
Albums produced by Scott Hendricks